The 2007–08 season was East Bengal's 1st season in the I-League and 88th season in existence.

Competitions

Overall

Overview

Calcutta Football League

East Bengal finished the 2007 Calcutta Premier Division as runner-up with 26 points from 14 matches behind champions Mohun Bagan.

Fixtures & results

Federation Cup

East Bengal started the Federation Cup campaign in the Pre-Quarter Finals against Kolkata giants Mohammedan Sporting and won 3–1 with Ashim Biswas putting them ahead in the 21st minute. Kalia Kulothungan equalised for Mohammedan but Edmilson Marques Pardal scored twice to take the team to the last 8. In the Quarter-Final, East Bengal faced hosts JCT and won 3–2 with another brace from Edmilson after Irungbam Surkumar Singh put them ahead in the 14th minute. Eduardo da Silva Escobar and Renedy Singh scored for JCT. In the Semi-Final, East Bengal faced arch-rivals Mohun Bagan. Bhaichung Bhutia put Mohun Bagan ahead in the 12th minute but East Bengal rallied from behind to score three. Surkumar Singh equalised in the 25th minute while Dipendu Biswas and Ashim Biswas scored the other two. José Ramirez Barreto's goal in the 71st minute wasn't enough for Bagan as East Bengal won 3–2 to reach the final. In the Final, East Bengal defeated Mahindra United 2–1 with another brace from Brazilian forward Edmilson as they lifted their 5th Federation Cup title.

Bracket

Fixtures & results

I League

League table

Fixtures & results

Super Cup

2007 Federation Cup Champion East Bengal faced 2007-08 I-League Champion Dempo in the 2008 Super Cup. Dempo won 1–0 courtesy of a solitary goal from Chidi Edeh.

Fixtures & results

IFA Shield

Group B

East Bengal was grouped alongside Mahindra United and Santos in Group B. East Bengal lost 2–0 against Mahindra United in the opening game and drew 1–1 against Santos as they were eliminated from the group stages.

Fixtures & results

AFC Cup

Group stage

Fixtures & results

Statistics

Appearances
Players with no appearances are not included in the list.

Goal scorers

References

East Bengal Club seasons